The 2022 Epping Forest District Council election took place on 5 May 2022 to elect members of Epping Forest District Council in England. This was on the same day as other local elections.

The results were seen as a crucial test for the strength of the Conservative Party in the district following the allegations of Coronavirus rule-breaking in Number 10 by Prime Minister, Boris Johnson. 

Before the election, one Conservative councillor had the whip removed from her, whilst a seat was made vacant in Waltham Abbey North East due to the resignation of the previous councillor for that ward.

Results summary

Ward results
Detailed below are all of the candidates nominated to stand in each ward in the upcoming election. Figures are compared to the last time these seats were contested in any election cycle for the Epping Forest District Council election.

Buckhurst Hill East

Buckhurst Hill West

Chigwell Village

Chipping Ongar, Greensted and Marden Ash

Epping Hemnall

Epping Lindsey & Thornwood Common

Grange Hill

Loughton Alderton

Loughton Broadway

Loughton Fairmead

Loughton Forest

Loughton Roding

Loughton St. John's

Loughton St. Mary's

Lower Nazeing

North Weald Bassett

Theydon Bois

Waltham Abbey Honey Lane

Waltham Abbey North East

This by-election was called due to the resignation of the previous sitting Conservative councillor, Ann Mitchell.

Waltham Abbey Paternoster

By-elections

Waltham Abbey South West

References

Epping Forest
Epping Forest District Council elections
2020s in Essex